Morris Trewin is a Canadian retired ice hockey goaltender who was an All-American for Michigan Tech.

Career
Trewin made a splash in his first season as a starter for Michigan Tech, helping the team win the WCHA regular season title while allowing the fewest goals in conference. He was named to the All-WCHA first team and an All-American but could not stop 7th-place North Dakota from scoring 6 goals in the opening round of the conference tournament, ending the Huskies' season. MTU was expecting big things from their new starter in his second season, however, the team tumbled down the standings and Trewin allowed more than a goal per game more in 1972. Michigan Tech finished 7th in the standings but nearly upset Wisconsin in the tournament, losing 7–9 on aggregate.

Trewin continued to founder the next season, playing just 8 games before leaving the program when two other Huskies netminders began turning in better performances. Trewin made a few appearances for senior hockey teams over the next few years to see if he could recapture his form in 1971 but nothing came to fruition.

Statistics

Regular season and playoffs

Awards and honors

References

External links

Canadian ice hockey goaltenders
Ice hockey people from Ontario
Sportspeople from Thunder Bay
Michigan Tech Huskies men's ice hockey players
AHCA Division I men's ice hockey All-Americans
Living people
Year of birth missing (living people)